The 2002 Western & Southern Financial Group Masters was a men's tennis tournament played on outdoor hard courts. It was the 101st edition of the Cincinnati Masters and was part of the Tennis Masters Series of the 2002 ATP Tour. It took place at the Lindner Family Tennis Center in Mason, Ohio in the United States from August 5 through August 12, 2002. Carlos Moyá, who was seeded 16th, won the singles title.

The tournament had previously appeared as part of Tier III of the WTA Tour but no event was held from 1989 to 2003.

Finals

Singles

 Carlos Moyá defeated  Lleyton Hewitt 7–5, 7–6(7–5)
 It was Moyá's 4th title of the year and the 11th of his career. It was his 1st Masters title of the year and his 2nd overall.

Doubles

 James Blake /  Todd Martin defeated  Mahesh Bhupathi /  Max Mirnyi 7–5, 6–3
 It was Blake's 1st title of the year and the 1st of his career. It was Martin's only title of the year and the 13th of his career.

References

External links
 
 Association of Tennis Professionals (ATP) tournament profile

 
Western and Southern Financial Group Masters
2002
Western and Southern Financial Group Masters